Major General Steven Sabiiti Muzeyi, is a Ugandan military officer and police officer, who served as the Deputy Inspector General of Police (DIGP) of the Uganda Police Force, the second-highest rank in that branch of Uganda's government, effective 4 March 2018 to Tuesday 16 December 2020. He replaced Martin Okoth Ochola, who was promoted to Inspector General of Police. Immediately prior to his assignment as Deputy IGP, Sabiiti, at the rank of brigadier, served as the Commander of the Military Police of the Uganda People's Defence Force (UPDF). Sabiiti was replaced  as Deputy IGP by Major General Paul Lokech. On Friday, 5 February 2021, Major Genenral Sabiiti Muzeyi was appointed General Manager Luwero Industries, a subsidiary of National Enterprise Corporation (NEC).

Background and education
He was born in Mbarara District circa 1975. Sabiiti’s father Zekeriah Muzeyi Magyenyi was married to one of Museveni’s maternal aunties. A veteran of Uganda's bush war, Magyenyi died in June 2007. Sabiiti’s mother is Javanis Magyenyi. The young Sabiiti attended Ntare School, then Mbarara High School before he was admitted to Makerere University, Uganda's oldest and largest public university.

At Makerere he studied biochemistry, graduating with a First Class Honors degree of Bachelor of Science. In 1997, he joined the UPDF, signing up in what was then the Presidential Protection Unit (PPU). PPU has since been renamed the Special Forces Command (SFC). Sabiiti attended boot camp at Kasenyi Training Wing, in Entebbe. A total of 117 recruits began the basic training course. Twenty five of them dropped out and the new Captain Sabiiti Muzeyi graduated at the top of the remaining 92.

Later, he studied at the Uganda Senior Command and Staff College, in Jinja, in Uganda's Eastern Region. At the rank of colonel, he won a slot to attend a senior command course at the United States Army Command and General Staff College at Fort Leavenworth, in Kansas. When the United States government blocked his admission, he was instead sent to a military college in Russia.

Career
Sabiiti was a member of the PPU security forces that provided VIP security during the visit of United States President Bill Clinton to Uganda 1998. He then enrolled into graduate school and lectured part-time on the advice of family members, before returning to the PPU.

He progressively rose in rank, taking on increased responsibility on the way. When PPU was renamed Presidential Guard Brigade (PGB), with first-son Muhoozi Kainerugaba at the helm, Sabiiti Muzeyi was selected as his second-in-command. Sabiiti, at the rank of lieutenant colonel, commanded the unit, when Muhoozi was in South Africa, attending a military course.

When Muhoozi was promoted to brigadier, Sabiiti was elevated to colonel. He became brigadier and commander of the Uganda Military Police, after his return from the Russian military course. On the evening of Sunday 4 March 2018, he was appointed Deputy Inspector General of Police, to deputize Martin Okoth Ochola.

In February 2019, as part of a promotion exercise involving over 2,000 men and women in the UPDF, he was promoted from brigadier to major general.

Family
Steven Sabiiti Muzeeyi is married to Esther Sabiiti, and together are the parents of two children.

See also
 Uganda Police Force
 Katumba Wamala
James Birungi
 Luke Kercan Ofungi
 Don Nabasa

References

External links
Brigadier Sabiiti Muzeyi appointed military police commander As at 4 April 2017.

1970s births
Living people
Law enforcement in Uganda
People from Mbarara District
People from Western Region, Uganda
Uganda Senior Command and Staff College alumni
Ugandan generals
Makerere University alumni
Ugandan military personnel
People educated at Mbarara High School